Southfleet is a small village and civil parish in the borough of Dartford in Kent, England. The village is located three miles southwest of Gravesend, while the parish includes within its boundaries the hamlets of Betsham and Westwood.

Southfleet takes its name from the River Fleet, a minor tributary of the River Thames. The water that supplied the river came from a place called Springhead, where there were watercress and oyster beds; the river then flowed through Southfleet, Ebbsfleet and Northfleet.

Notable buildings

The village is grouped around a crossroads and many of its buildings, including the Ship Inn, are extremely old. The parish church of St Nicholas has 14th-century origins, although pre-Roman Christian remains have been found in the area. The church has memorials of the Sedley, Swan, and Peyton families.

Governance
Southfleet fell within the Hundred of Axstane. The Local Government Act 1972 made the parish part of the borough of Dartford of Kent in 1974. The settlement of New Barn in the south of the parish was transferred to  Longfield and New Barn parish in 1987.

Transport
Southfleet had a railway station on the Gravesend West Line, which operated from 1886 to 1953. The section of the trackbed south of the A2 road of that closed line was used by Eurostar services to London Waterloo.

The station provides rail services to London, The Medway Towns, Dover and Ramsgate.

The village is currently served by the Go-Coach routes 474/475 buses as well as the Arriva Kent Thameside route 489. These services provide connections to Gravesend, Bluewater, Longfield and New Ash Green.

References

External links

Parish Council website

Villages in Kent
Borough of Dartford
Civil parishes in Kent